Carlos Selfa Sanfélix (born 25 April 1992) is a Spanish footballer who plays for Mérida AD as a central midfielder.

Club career
Born in Sueca, Valencia, Valencian Community, Selfa joined Levante UD's youth setup in 2007, aged 15. He made his senior debuts with the reserves, playing his first campaign in Tercera División and the other two in Segunda División B.

In July 2013 Selfa moved to another reserve team, CA Osasuna B also in the fourth level. After appearing regularly he moved to UD Almería on 17 January of the following year, being assigned to the B-team in the third division.

On 23 November, after profiting from Corona's injury and Thomas Partey's suspension, Selfa was called up to the main squad for a La Liga match against Granada CF. He made his professional debut a day later, replacing Fernando Soriano in the 60th minute of the 0–0 away draw.

On 6 May 2015 Selfa renewed his contract with the Andalusians, signing until 2018. On 2 August of the following year, he was loaned to Real Balompédica Linense for one year, still in the third division.

Upon returning, Selfa terminated his contract with Almería on 11 August 2017, and joined third level club SCR Peña Deportiva just hours later.

References

External links

1992 births
Living people
People from Ribera Baixa
Sportspeople from the Province of Valencia
Spanish footballers
Footballers from the Valencian Community
Association football midfielders
La Liga players
Segunda División B players
Tercera División players
Atlético Levante UD players
CA Osasuna B players
UD Almería B players
UD Almería players
Real Balompédica Linense footballers
CF Villanovense players
CD Ebro players
Yeclano Deportivo players
Mérida AD players